Brian McNaughton (born 22 January 1963) is a Scottish retired footballer, who played as a forward for Heart of Midlothian in the Scottish Football League Premier Division. He was most recently the manager of Broxburn Athletic in the Scottish Junior Football Association, East Region.

References

External links

1963 births
Living people
Footballers from Edinburgh
Association football forwards
Scottish footballers
East Fife F.C. players
Forfar Athletic F.C. players
Heart of Midlothian F.C. players
Livingston F.C. players
Arbroath F.C. players
Broxburn Athletic F.C. players
Whitburn Junior F.C. players
Penicuik Athletic F.C. players
Scottish Football League players
Scottish Junior Football Association players
Scottish football managers
Broxburn Athletic F.C. managers
Whitburn F.C. non-playing staff